Nõo Parish is a rural municipality in Tartu County, Estonia.

Settlements
Small boroughs
Nõo - Tõravere
Villages
Aiamaa - Altmäe - Etsaste - Enno - Illi - Järiste - Kääni - Keeri - Ketneri - Kolga - Laguja - Luke - Meeri - Nõgiaru - Sassi - Tamsa - Unipiha - Uuta - Vissi - Voika

Religion

Gallery

Twinnings
Nõo Parish is twinned with:
 Liminka Municipality, Finland
 Viitasaari, Finland

See also
Tartu Observatory
Luke Manor

References

External links